Robert Frank "Bob" "The Goose" Gagliano (born September 5, 1958), is a former professional American football player. He began his career playing quarterback for Glendale Community College. He then played for United States International University in San Diego, and Utah State University. He was drafted into the National Football League (NFL) by the Kansas City Chiefs in 1981. In 1994, rookie Perry Klein beat him out for the No. 3 quarterback slot with the Atlanta Falcons.  In 1989, he led the Detroit Lions to 5 consecutive victories to conclude the season.  This is where he was first pegged with the nickname "The Goose".  He also played for the United States Football League's Denver Gold.

References

External links
Glendale C.C. Athletic HOF
Pro-Football-Reference

1958 births
Living people
American football quarterbacks
Atlanta Falcons players
Detroit Lions players
Denver Gold players
Glendale Vaqueros football players
Houston Oilers players
Indianapolis Colts players
Kansas City Chiefs players
San Diego Chargers players
San Francisco 49ers players
United States International Gulls football players
Utah State Aggies football players
Players of American football from Los Angeles
National Football League replacement players